Codium pomoides is a species of seaweed in the Codiaceae family.

In Western Australia is found along the coast in the Goldfields-Esperance region around the Recherche Archipelago extending along the south coast as far as Victoria and the north coast of Tasmania.

References

pomoides
Plants described in 1894